The 1885 Wellington City mayoral election was part of the New Zealand local elections held that same year to decide who would take the office of Mayor of Wellington.

Background
Incumbent mayor George Fisher retired after four years. Three city councillors (Arthur Winton Brown, Sam Brown and Thomas Wilmor McKenzie) as well as a former mayor (Joe Dransfield) contested the mayoralty.

Election results
The following table gives the election results:

Notes

References

Mayoral elections in Wellington
1885 elections in New Zealand
Politics of the Wellington Region
1880s in Wellington
November 1885 events